Narmada Pushkaram is a festival of River Narmada normally occurs once in 12 years. This Pushkaram is observed for a period  of 12 days from the time of entry of Jupiter into Vrushabha Rasi (Taurus).

 Amarkantak temple,  Omkareshawar Temple,  Chausath Yogini Temple,  Chaubis Avatar Temple, Maheshwar Maheshwar Temple, Nemawar  Siddheshwar Mandir and Bhojpur Shiva Temple are very ancient and famous. Omkareshawar is one of the twelve  Jyothirlingas and Amrarkantak are the best places to take holy bath in the  Naramada river.

See also 
Kumbh Mela
Godavari Pushkaralu
Pushkaram

References

Religious festivals in India
Water and Hinduism
Hindu festivals
Religious tourism in India
Hindu pilgrimages
Narmada River